Nakht or Nakhti is the name of several ancient Egyptian officials:

Nakht, official during the 18th Dynasty
Tomb of Nakht (TT52), his tomb
Nakht (high steward) during the 12th Dynasty
Nakht (BH21), nomarch during the 12th Dynasty
Nakhtpaaten, vizier during the 18th Dynasty, sometimes shortened to "Nakht"